Adán Cárdenas del Castillo (7 June 1836 – 1 January 1916) was a Nicaraguan politician and doctor. He also served as the President of Nicaragua between 1 March 1883 and 1 March 1887. He was a member of the Conservative Party of Nicaragua.

Cárdenas was born in the colonial city of Granada on the shores of Lake Cocibolca in Nicaragua. He and his parent moved to Europe for some time in 1852, where he attended the National school of Genoa and received a doctorate in medicine at the University of Pisa in Tuscany, Italy. He returned to Nicaragua in 1862.

He was married to Gertrudis Martínez Solórzano, daughter of Tomás Martínez Guerrero, 36th President of Nicaragua, and wife Gertrudis Solórzano Zavala. His grandson, René Cárdenas, became the first Spanish-language announcer to cover Major League Baseball.

References

Presidents of Nicaragua
University of Pisa alumni
1836 births
1916 deaths
Conservative Party (Nicaragua) politicians
19th-century Nicaraguan people